FK Jedinstvo is a Serbian football club based in Ruma, Serbia.

History
For the 2007–08 season, FK Jedinstvo competes in the Vojvodjanska Liga – Jug. Last season they finished 12th.

Jedinstvo Ruma
Jedinstvo Ruma